Shorenstein is a real estate investment company based in San Francisco that owns interests in  of office space throughout the United States. The company has sponsored twelve closed-end real estate funds, with total equity commitments of $8.8 billion, including $723.5 million from the company.

The main office of the social media company Twitter at 1355 Market Street, San Francisco, belongs to Shorenstein, as was reported when Twitter was in arrear for paying rent.

History
In 1946, after being discharged from the military, Walter Shorenstein joined Milton Meyer & Company, which was later renamed Shorenstein Company.

In the early 1990s, Walter Shorenstein stepped back from day-to-day operations of the company. His son, Douglas W. Shorenstein, became chief executive officer of the company in 1995. Walter Shorenstein died in 2010 at age 95 and Douglas Shorenstein died at age 60 of cancer in 2015.  In 2020, Brandon Shorenstein, Doug's son, was named Chairman and CEO.

References

Companies based in San Francisco
Real estate companies of the United States